Dragoon National Forest was established in Arizona on May 25, 1907, with . On July 1, 1908, it was combined with Santa Catalina National Forest and Santa Rita National Forest to create Coronado National Forest. The name was discontinued.

The forest included the Dragoon and Little Dragoon Mountains, two of the Madrean Sky Islands.  The area is included in the Douglas Ranger District of Coronado National Forest.

References

External links
 Coronado National Forest
 Forest History Society
 Listing of the National Forests of the United States and Their Dates (from the Forest History Society website) – Text from Davis, Richard C., ed. Encyclopedia of American Forest and Conservation History. New York: Macmillan Publishing Company for the Forest History Society, 1983. Vol. II, pp. 743–88.

Former National Forests of Arizona
Geography of Cochise County, Arizona
Coronado National Forest
1907 establishments in Arizona Territory
Protected areas established in 1907
Protected areas disestablished in 1908
1908 disestablishments in Arizona Territory